Richard Morrissey (14 November 1894 – 5 July 1977) was an Irish hurler who played as a centre-forward for the Galway senior team.

Morrissey made his first appearance for the team in the early 1920s and was a regular member of the starting fifteen for much of the rest of the decade. During that time he won one All-Ireland medal as Galway claimed their first championship in 1923. Morrissey was an All-Ireland runner-up on four occasions.

At club level Morrissey was a four-time county club championship medalist with Craughwell.

References

1894 births
1977 deaths
Craughwell hurlers
Galway inter-county hurlers
All-Ireland Senior Hurling Championship winners